Deon Eugene Oosthuysen (born 4 December 1963 in Vanderbijlpark, South Africa) is a former South African rugby player. He never played in a test match, but played for South Africa in 12 tour matches.

Rugby career
He played for Western Transvaal (now known as the Leopards) and Northern Transvaal at provincial level. He was known for having a lot of pace and scored 85 tries in 140 matches for Northern Transvaal, which is, at the time of writing (2016), still a record for any Northern Transvaal/Blue Bulls player. Although he originally retired from playing in 1994 due to a hip injury, he made a comeback in 1996.

In addition to playing in 12 tour matches and scoring four tries for South Africa, he was also an accomplished sevens player and was for a while coach of the South African sevens team in the late 1990s.

See also
List of South Africa national rugby union players – Springbok no. 571

References

External links
 

1955 births
Living people
South African rugby union players
Afrikaner people
South African people of Dutch descent
Rugby union wings
South Africa international rugby sevens players
South Africa international rugby union players
Leopards (rugby union) players
Blue Bulls players